The 1988 Bowling Green Falcons football team was an American football team that represented Bowling Green University in the Mid-American Conference (MAC) during the 1988 NCAA Division I-A football season. In their third season under head coach Moe Ankney, the Falcons compiled a 2–8–1 record (1–6–1 against MAC opponents), finished in eighth place in the MAC, and were outscored by all opponents by a combined total of 333 to 159.

The team's statistical leaders included Eric Smith with 1,306 passing yards, Mike McGee with 504 rushing yards, and Ronald Heard with 622 receiving yards.

Schedule

References

Bowling Green
Bowling Green Falcons football seasons
Bowling Green Falcons football